Mark Sargeant (born August 1973) is an English chef and restaurateur from Larkfield, Kent.

Early life
Born in Kent, Sargeant grew up in Larkfield, Kent and attended Oakwood Park Grammar School in Maidstone. From an early age, Sargeant's interest in food and cooking grew strongly, leading to his first work experience cooking in the kitchens of the Larkfield Priory Hotel in 1988.

Career
Having graduated from West Kent College in 1991, Sargeant landed his first professional job at Boodle's Gentleman's Club in St James, London working with Keith Podmore in 1991. During his early years as a professional chef, Mark also worked at several respected restaurants including the role of Chef de Partie at Read's Restaurant in Faversham. In 1994, Mark took up a position at Le Souffle Restaurant at the Hyde Park Hotel for 18 months where he then moved onto Oliver Peyton's Coast restaurant in 1996. Within the same year, Mark Sargeant was awarded 'Young Chef of the Year'.

Sargeant first worked with Gordon Ramsay at Aubergine in 1997 before spending three years as Sous Chef at Restaurant Gordon Ramsay in Chelsea from 1998 to 2001, gaining 3 Michelin Starred Awards also in 2001. He then opened the highly acclaimed Gordon Ramsay at Claridge's where he was Chef de Cuisine from 2001 to 2008, which earned a Michelin star in 2002. At the time of his career at Claridges, Mark was awarded 'Chef of the Year' in 2002.

He also oversaw the openings of the Gordon Ramsay Holdings pubs including The Narrow, The Warrington, The Devonshire and The Foxtrot Oscar. Throughout his time with Gordon Ramsay, Mark was responsible for all of his media activities and co-authored his 12 books, wrote regular columns for the Times Magazine, Olive and BBC Good Food magazines, as well as assisting with the production of his television work both in the UK and abroad. After 13 years working under Ramsay, Sargeant resigned in November 2009 and joined The Swan Collection with The Swan in West Malling and The Swan at The Globe as Creative Director.

In 2011 Mark joined Canteen as consultant chef. June 2011 Mark Sargeant opened his first two solo projects in the coastal town of Folkestone in Kent, Rocksalt Restaurant and The Smokehouse Fish and Chips, where he first became a restaurateur. The opening of the two restaurants became part of the Regeneration Plan for Folkestone, and quickly became the hot spot destination for tourists and foodies alike. Rocksalt has since won a string of awards including 84th best restaurant in the Restaurant Magazine top 100 uk restaurants 2013, Best Restaurant in Kent 2014, 5th best restaurant by the sea in the Times magazine, 2 AA Rosettes and 4 AA stars for Rocksalt Rooms.

Mark's first cookbook was published in October 2011 "My Kind of Cooking" and is published by Quercus.

Sargeant was later approached in 2012 to create exclusive dishes for Royal Ascot where he developed five new dishes for the event.

ITV produced flagship Saturday morning cookery show ‘Saturday Cookbook’ which premiered on 14 April 2012, presented by Mark Sargeant and Nadia Sawalha.

In 2013, Mark became Chef Director of Plum and Spilt Milk, located within the Great Northern Hotel. Sargeant also became involved with Oxwell & Co in Singapore, where he became Chef Director.

Sargeant became the Chef Director at The Strand Dining Rooms in 2015, helping to devise a brand new menu for the restaurant.

Mark's first establishment The Duke William a country pub situated in Ickham, Kent, was launched early 2015. Shortly after, Rooms at The Duke William opened to the public after a full refurbishment in the spring 2015.

June 2015 saw Mark open Morden & Lea his first central London restaurant in Soho, serving a variety of modern and contemporary British dishes.

in February 2016 After an amicable agreement, Sargeant parted ways with Morden & Lea.

In 2021 Mark decided to leave the Rocksalt Group and sold his minor stake (Rocksalt Restaurant and bar, The Smokehouse, The Wife of Bath, The Duke William Pub)

In August 2022, Mark opened his first solo restaurant as Chef Patron at the self-named Brasserie MS in Clifton Gardens, Folkestone. Art-deco in style with a classic French menu, Mark is taking inspiration from the great French chefs of the 90s and re-imagining these ideas for the modern day, in a relaxed and comfortable setting. The Brasserie MS achieved 2AA rosettes within ten weeks of opening.

Awards 
 Young Chef of the Year - 1996
 Chef of the Year - 2002

Restaurants

Current restaurants

Previous restaurants

Television appearances 
 Boiling Point (5-part documentary) (Channel 4, 1998)
 Beyond Boiling Point (6-part documentary) (Channel 4, 2000)
 Ramsay's Kitchen Nightmares (Channel 4, 2004–present)
 Hell's Kitchen (UK) (ITV, 2004)
 The F Word (Channel 4, 2005–2010)
 Great British Menu (BBC Two, 2009), representing London and South East, losing to Tristan Welch in heats
  This Morning (ITV,2013)
   Cooks Questions' (Channel 4,2014)
 Saturday Kitchen (BBC One, 2005–present)
 Saturday Cookbook (ITV, 2012)
Beat the chef (channel 4),(2019–present)

Bibliography
Gordon Ramsay's Just Desserts (2001), Quadrille Publishing Ltd, 
Gordon Ramsay's Secret's (2003), Quadrille Publishing Ltd, 
Gordon Ramsay Makes it Easy (2005), Quadrille Publishing Ltd, 
Gordon Ramsay's Sunday Lunch (2006), Quadrille Publishing Ltd, 
Gordon Ramsay's 3 Star Chef (2008), Key Porter Books,  
Cooking for Friends:Food from My Table (Gordon Ramsay),(2008), HarperCollins, 
Gordon Ramsay's Healthy Appetite, (2008), Quadrille Publishing Ltd, 
Gordon Ramsay's Great British Pub Food, (2009), HarperCollins, 
Gordon Ramsay's World Kitchen, (2009), Quadrille Publishing Ltd, 
Gordon Ramsay's Great Escape, (2010), HarperCollins, 
My Kind of Cooking, (2011), Quercus, 
We Love Potatoes, (2012), The Little Big Voice, 
Saturday Kitchen Cooking Bible, (2013), W&N,

References

External links
 Mark Sargeant Official website

1973 births
Living people
English chefs
English television chefs
ITV Breakfast presenters and reporters
People from Tonbridge and Malling (district)